John Alfred Alexander Lee  (31 October 1891 – 13 June 1982) was a New Zealand politician and writer. He is one of the more prominent avowed socialists in New Zealand's political history.

Lee was elected as a member of parliament in 1922. After the Labour Party's victory in 1935, Lee was passed over for appointment to cabinet, instead becoming an under-secretary. He became a critic of the leadership of his party and was expelled in 1940, subsequently founding his own left-wing party, the Democratic Labour Party. He lost his parliamentary seat at the 1943 election.

Biography

Early life

Lee was born in Dunedin in 1891, the son of Alfred Lee and Mary Isabella Taylor. His parents were not married, and at the time of his birth, they had already separated due to his father's gambling and alcoholism. Lee's mother had little income, and the family experienced considerable financial hardship. Lee did not do well at school, and he was often truant. In 1905, he left school to work, and became involved in petty crime. In 1908, he was convicted of theft, and served time at a boarding school for juvenile delinquents. He attempted to escape several times, and was eventually successful. After wandering the country for a time, he found work in Raetihi, but was then jailed for liquor smuggling and breaking and entering.

Three years after being released, Lee enlisted in the New Zealand Expeditionary Force, and served in World War I. He was awarded the Distinguished Conduct Medal for action at Messines in June 1917, but was repatriated after being wounded in March 1918 and losing his left arm. He arrived back in New Zealand in July 1919, and established a small business. Lee wrote a novel Citizen into Soldier in 1937 inspired by his wartime experiences.

Early political career

Not long after returning home, Lee became active in the Labour Party. Lee had been a committed socialist for some time, having read a large amount of Marxist literature over the years. He is said to have heard the speeches of Bob Semple and Harry Scott Bennett through the bars of his jail cell, and in the army, he had been known as "Bolshie Lee" for his views. Lee's status as a veteran was considered valuable by the Labour Party, as the party's anti-conscription stance had caused many to brand it unpatriotic — Lee, a decorated and wounded soldier, was able to counter this perception quite effectively. By 1920, Lee was on the Labour Party's national executive.

In , Lee contested the by-election in the Auckland East electorate caused by the resignation of Arthur Myers, but he was defeated by Clutha Mackenzie. In the 1922 general election, however, he stood again and was elected. He soon became one of the better known Members of Parliament, noted for his powerful oratory and strong views. He also played a considerable role in the Labour Party's internal policy formulation, where he had a strong interest in foreign affairs, defence and economics.

In 1927 the Representation Commission had proposed altering the boundaries of the  electorate; which if confirmed would have made the electorate "dry" or no-licence, and without an authority which could issue temporary licences for the Ellerslie and Alexandra Park raceways. Following objections, the boundary between the Parnell and Auckland East electorates was adjusted to include a hotel in the Parnell electorate (so retaining its licensing committee).

So after the 1928 election, Lee took a job managing the Palace Hotel in Rotorua (though he did not drink) for Ernest Davis.

In the 1931 election, Lee won the electorate of Grey Lynn, having controversially defeated another former MP, Fred Bartram, for the Labour nomination. The major political issue of the day was the Great Depression, and Lee played a significant role in the formulation of Labour's economic policies. Lee also wrote his first novel, Children of the Poor — the book was largely autobiographical, and was a considerable success. The book argued that poverty generated crime and vice, and that only a socialist program could solve society's problems. He produced a sequel The Hunted in 1936. In the early 1930s Lee served on the Auckland Rugby League's board and later served as chairman. In 1935, he was awarded the King George V Silver Jubilee Medal.

Lee caused ructions in the Auckland Labour Party ahead of the 1935 mayoral election. He incited a selection controversy after the Labour Party selected local businessman Joe Sayegh over prominent lawyer and MP Rex Mason at the behest of Auckland Labour Representation Committee executive Fred Young. Sayegh was regarded as a competent city councillor and respectable individual, but he was given little chance of defeating Citizens Committee candidate Ernest Davis (Lee's former employer). As Young had also been employed by Davis for many years, Lee and several other Labour MPs asserted that Young had been bribed by Davis to make certain the selection of a weak Labour mayoral candidate for the mayoralty.Lee agitated against Sayegh's campaign and tried to discredit him, labeling him as a "dumb wop fellow who could not even speak English". Despite Lee's interference, Sayegh polled better than anticipated in the election, losing to Davis by only 363 votes and topping the poll in the council vote where Labour secured a majority.

Rebel

When Labour won the 1935 election with a large majority, and formed its first government, many expected Lee to enter Cabinet. However, Lee did not have the support of Michael Joseph Savage, the new Prime Minister. Savage appears to have considered Lee too radical and uncontrolled, while Lee considered Savage too cautious. The two had clashed on a number of policy issues, and in the end, Lee was not awarded ministerial rank — instead, he became an under-secretary. This position did not, however, have any legal authority until the following year, when Lee threatened to resign. Given responsibility for housing, Lee quickly moved to implement a "socialist" plan for state housing, with the construction of many new dwellings for the poor.

While Lee was highly enthusiastic about his housing program, he became increasingly unhappy with the new government's economic policies, which he saw as overly cautious.  Lee gradually emerged as the leader of Labour's left-wing faction, opposed primarily by the more orthodox Minister of Finance, Walter Nash.  Lee and his allies, as well as being strongly socialist, were influenced by social credit theory, and believed that the government should take immediate control of the country's financial system.  Nash opposed this, and was able to block proposals put forward by Lee to nationalise the Bank of New Zealand.  Gradually, Lee's criticism of the Labour Party's leadership became increasingly public.

As well as arguing for a more socialist policy platform, Lee also criticised the Labour Party's internal structure.  In particular, he sought to abolish the tradition of having the Prime Minister appoint Cabinet — instead, he wished Cabinet to be elected by caucus.  This was rejected by Savage, and Lee began to portray himself not merely as a campaigner for socialism but as a campaigner for internal party democracy.  This stance won Lee considerable support from those who otherwise disliked his views.  Lee's attacks came at a time of considerable difficulty for the Labour Party — Michael Joseph Savage was now seriously ill, and World War II was breaking out.

Departure from the Labour Party 

Lee was censured by the Labour Party conference of 1939, but continued to attack Labour's leaders for what Lee regarded as Labour's failure to implement socialist policies.  On 25 March 1940, Lee was finally expelled from the Labour Party. Lee subsequently published a further attack on Savage and his leadership of the Labour Party entitled "Expelled from the Labour Party for telling the truth: psycho-pathology in politics". Savage died two days later, and was succeeded as Prime Minister by Peter Fraser, a member of the faction opposed to Lee's left-wingers.  Lee quickly announced the establishment of the new Democratic Labour Party, with himself as leader.  He was joined by Bill Barnard, the Speaker and former Mid-Canterbury Labour MP Horace Herring . Others, e.g. John Payne, Labour MP Rex Mason and Independent MP Harry Atmore were sympathetic.

However, Lee soon alienated many of his supporters (including Barnard) with what was seen as an "autocratic" leadership style, ironic considering his complaints against Savage. In the 1943 election, the Democratic Labour Party put forward 52 candidates, including Keith Hay, Alfred E. Allen and Colin Scrimgeour (who stood against Peter Fraser in ). The DLP won only 4.3% of the vote, Lee lost his seat to Labour candidate Fred Hackett, and none were elected. Barnard stood as an Independent and also lost.

Death and legacy 
Although his parliamentary career was over, Lee continued to write. He remained strongly hostile to the Labour Party, and denounced its leaders as traitors to the working class. In 1963, he published his political memoirs, entitled Simple on a Soap-box. He continued to comment on political matters for some time, although he surprised many with his defence of the United States in the Vietnam War. He was awarded an honorary LLD by the University of Otago in 1969. Lee died in Auckland in 1982.  His wife, Marie (Mollie) Lee, had died in 1976. They had no children, although they raised Lee's three nephews after his sister's death.

In his will, Lee asked that his private papers be deposited with Auckland Libraries a year after his death. Amongst his papers are his scrapbooks, which reflect his highly opinionated personality. Photographs and newspaper clippings have been hastily attached with pink elastoplast. There are copious annotations in red ballpoint - warm and generous to family and friends but still nursing grudges, decades later, against old foes.

Bill Pearson wrote "People condemned the novels of John A. Lee out of Puritanism but they did not doubt that he was lifting the screen from the indecent truth."

In 1989, Mervyn Thompson adapted Children of the Poor into a successful musical play.

In 1975 the corner at the intersection of Great North Road and Point Chevalier Road, in the Auckland suburb of Point Chevalier, was named after Lee, as was a new block of pensioner flats nearby.

Sporting involvement
Lee was also involved with sport. He was the president of the Newton Rangers Rugby League club in 1933 and was heavily involved with Auckland Rugby League being the president for many years until his retirement from the position at the start of 1942.

Works 

Books (first publication)
 Children of the Poor, 1934.
 The Hunted, 1936.
 Civilian into Soldier, 1937.
 Socialism in New Zealand, 1938.
 The Yanks are Coming, 1943.
 Shining with the Shiner, 1944.
 Simple on a Soapbox, 1963.
 Shiner Slattery, 1964
 Rhetoric at the Red Dawn, 1965.
 The Lee Way to Public Speaking, 1965
 Delinquent Days, 1967.
 Mussolini’s Millions, 1970
 Political Notebooks, 1973.
 For Mine is the Kingdom, 1975
 Soldier,  1976
 The Scrim-Lee Papers. 1976 (with CG Scrimgeour & Tony Simson)
 Roughnecks, Rolling Stones & Rouseabouts, 1977
 Early Days in New Zealand, 1977
 The John A. Lee Diaries 1936–1940, 1981
 The Politician, 1987 (but written in 1936.)

Plus numerous pamphlets mainly published during his political days. Lee also produced a political journal, "John A Lee’s Weekly" (which underwent several name changes) from 1940 to 1954.

References

Further reading
 Erik Olssen, "W.T. Mills, E.J.B. Allen, J.A. Lee and Socialism in New Zealand," NZ Journal of History, vol. 10, no. 2 (1976), pp. 112–129.
Lee, John A.. "I walked again". In Owen, Alwyn (ed.). Snapshots of the Century: 'Spectrum' covers 100 years of New Zealand history. Auckland: Tandem Press. 1998. pp. 27–34. .

External links

 1966 Encyclopaedia of New Zealand

New Zealand Labour Party MPs
Independent MPs of New Zealand
Leaders of political parties in New Zealand
New Zealand memoirists
New Zealand male writers
1891 births
1982 deaths
New Zealand recipients of the Distinguished Conduct Medal
Politicians from Dunedin
Democratic Labour Party (New Zealand) politicians
New Zealand rugby league administrators
Members of the New Zealand House of Representatives
New Zealand MPs for Auckland electorates
Unsuccessful candidates in the 1943 New Zealand general election
Unsuccessful candidates in the 1928 New Zealand general election
New Zealand military personnel of World War I
Unsuccessful candidates in the 1949 New Zealand general election
New Zealand politicians with disabilities
20th-century memoirists
New Zealand amputees
Writers from Dunedin